Elis is an album by Brazilian singer Elis Regina released in 1972, contains some successes as "Bala com Bala", "Nada Será como Antes", "Casa no Campo" e "Atrás da Porta".

It was listed by Rolling Stone Brazil as one of the 100 best Brazilian albums in history.

Track listing
All arrangements written by César Camargo Mariano
20 Anos Blue (Sueli Costa, Vítor Martins) – 3:11
Bala com Bala (João Bosco, Aldir Blanc) – 3:12
Nada Será como Antes (Milton Nascimento, Ronaldo Bastos) – 2:45
Mucuripe (Raimundo Fagner, Antonio Carlos Belchior) – 2:27
Olhos Abertos (Zé Rodrix, Guttemberg Guarabyra) – 2:37
Vida de Bailarina (Américo Seixas, Dorival Silva) – 2:25
Águas de Março (Antonio Carlos Jobim) – 3:05
Atrás da Porta (Francis Hime, Chico Buarque de Hollanda) – 2:48
Cais (Milton Nascimento, Ronaldo Bastos) – 3:17
Me Deixa em Paz (Ivan Lins, Ronaldo Monteiro de Souza) – 2:10
Casa no Campo (Zé Rodrix, Tavito) – 2:45
Boa Noite Amor (José Maria de Abreu, Francisco Matoso) – 2:23
Bonus track on 2002 Japanese Mercury CD release
13. Entrudo (Carlos Lyra, Ruy Guerra) –  2:47

Credits
Production director: Roberto Menescal
Production assistant: Sepé
Recording technicians: Ary, João and Toninho
Cutting: Joaquim Figueira
Photography: José Maria de Melo
Cover design: Aldo Luiz

References

Elis Regina albums
1972 albums